Clarence Melvin Zener (December 1, 1905 – July 2, 1993) was the American physicist who first (1934) described the property concerning the breakdown of electrical insulators. These findings were later exploited by Bell Labs in the development of the Zener diode, which was duly named after him. Zener was a theoretical physicist with a background in mathematics who conducted research in a wide range of subjects including: superconductivity, metallurgy, ferromagnetism, elasticity, fracture mechanics, diffusion, and geometric programming.

Life 

Zener was born in Indianapolis, Indiana and earned his PhD in physics under Edwin Kemble at Harvard in 1929.  His thesis was titled Quantum Mechanics of the Formation of Certain Types of Diatomic Molecules. In 1957 he received the Bingham Medal for his work in rheology, in 1959 the John Price Wetherill Medal from The Franklin Institute, in 1965 the Albert Souveur Achievement Award, in 1974 the Gold Medal from American Society for Metals, in 1982 the Von Hippel Award from the Materials Research Society, and in 1985 received the ICIFUAS (International Conference on Internal Friction and Ultrasonic Attenuation in Solids) Prize for the discovery of the Zener effect, pioneering studies of anelasticity in metals and prediction and observation of thermoelastic damping. ICIFUAS Prize was later renamed after Zener, following his death in 1993. A notable doctoral student of Zener's was John B. Goodenough and Arthur S. Nowick held a postdoctoral appointment under Zener.

Zener was a research fellow at the University of Bristol from 1932 to 1934. He taught at Washington University in St. Louis (1935–1937), the City College of New York (1937–1940), and Washington State University (1940–1942) before working at the Watertown Arsenal during World War II. After the war, he taught at University of Chicago (1945–1951) where he was Professor of Physics, before being appointed as Director of Science at Pittsburgh's Westinghouse (1951–1965). Here he developed his system of Geometric programming, which he used to solve engineering problems using adjustable parameters, defined by mathematical functions. Using this, Zener modeled designs for heat exchangers, to perform ocean thermal energy conversion, and discovered the most suitable areas for their deployment; many of these models are still being used today.  Following his career at Westinghouse, Zener returned to teaching, leaving Pittsburgh briefly to become a professor at Texas A&M University (1966–1968) but returned to finish his career at Carnegie Mellon University (1968–1993).

Personality 

Zener was known both for his dislike of experimental work and for preferring to work on practical problems within the arena of applied physics. Although he had a reputation of being very successful in these endeavors, he apparently considered himself as being less qualified to work on purely theoretical physics problems.  In recognition of this, he once commented, after having dined with physicist J. Robert Oppenheimer: "when it came to fundamental physics, it was clear there was no point in competing with a person like that."

Eponyms 
Zener effect
Zener diode
Zener pinning
Zener–Hollomon parameter
Landau–Zener formula
Zener double-exchange mechanism
Zener ratio, an elastic anisotropy factor for cubic crystals
Zener model for viscoelastic solids

See also
Bloch oscillation
Mist lift
Posynomial
Slater's rules

References

External links 
National Academy of Sciences Biography
Rememberances of Clarence Zener
Obituary

20th-century American physicists
American physicists
Harvard Graduate School of Arts and Sciences alumni
American materials scientists
Rheologists
1905 births
1993 deaths
University of Chicago alumni
Carnegie Mellon University faculty
Academics of the University of Bristol
Washington University in St. Louis faculty
Washington University physicists
Fellows of the American Physical Society
Washington State University faculty
Texas A&M University faculty